Weissella hellenica is a species of Gram-positive bacteria, placed within the family of Leuconostocaceae. It is frequently isolated from fermented sausage and flounder intestine, as well as Korean fermented pickle Kimchi and barrels used to make Japanese pickles. Some strains have been observed to be probiotic while some have not. Some strains produce bacteriocins named weissellicins which show antimicrobial activity against other bacteria.

References

External links
List of species of the genus Weissella
ZipcodeZoo entry
UniProt entry
Type strain of Weissella hellenica at BacDive -  the Bacterial Diversity Metadatabase
Weissella hellenica at the KEGG database

Weissella
Bacteria described in 1993